Tobias Rau (born 31 December 1981) is a German former professional footballer who played as a left back.

In a career blighted by injuries, he retired from professional play at only 27.

Club career

Wolfsburg
Rau was born in Braunschweig, Lower Saxony. After making his professional debut at the third level of the German league pyramid with hometown club Eintracht Braunschweig, he moved to the professionals with VfL Wolfsburg.

Rau amassed 52 official appearances for the latter side. His Bundesliga debut came on 18 August 2001, starting and featuring 52 minutes in a 1–1 home draw against SC Freiburg.

Bayern Munich
In June 2003, Rau's solid performances caught the attention of powerhouse FC Bayern Munich. However, several serious injuries and stiff competition from Frenchmen Willy Sagnol and Bixente Lizarazu restricted his chances to 19 games across all competitions (with a further eight for the reserve team).

Arminia Bielefeld
In the summer of 2005, Rau signed with Arminia Bielefeld, where he would also be a backup and suffer severely with injuries – only an average of eight league matches in four years – being released on 30 June 2009 before announcing his retirement on 6 July.

International career
Rau played seven times for Germany, all in 2003. His debut came on 12 February in a friendly with Spain played in Palma, Majorca, and his only goal contributed to a 4–1 home defeat of Canada on 1 June.

Personal life
In July 2009, shortly after retiring, Rau announced his return to school to start a career as a teacher despite having offers from clubs abroad and from the 2. Bundesliga.

Rau returned to playing football in 2012, joining Kreisliga amateurs TV Neuenkirchen.

Career statistics

References

External links
 
 
 
 

1981 births
Living people
Sportspeople from Braunschweig
German footballers
Association football defenders
Bundesliga players
Eintracht Braunschweig players
VfL Wolfsburg players
FC Bayern Munich footballers
Arminia Bielefeld players
Germany under-21 international footballers
Germany B international footballers
Germany international footballers
Footballers from Lower Saxony